The 2002 Commonwealth Games results and medallists for events from aquatics to wrestling can be found in this article.

Aquatics

Athletics

Badminton

Boxing

Cycling

Gymnastics

Field hockey

Judo

Lawn bowls

Netball

Rugby sevens

Shooting

Men

Women 

 Due to the fact that there were only three pairs of competitors, only the gold medal was awarded.

Open

Squash

Table tennis

Triathlon

Weightlifting

Men
2002 marks the last edition of Commonwealth Games to award gold medals in each category of snatch, clean & jerk and combined total.

Women

Wrestling

Freestyle

References

External links
2002 Commonwealth Game Results
Games Legacy – Manchester commonwealth games 2002
Frozen reference site for the XVII Commonwealth Games.
BBC coverage –  Excellent for checking times/positions

results